Ilkley is a civil parish in the metropolitan borough of the City of Bradford, West Yorkshire, England.  It contains 80 listed buildings that are recorded in the National Heritage List for England.  Of these, three are listed at Grade I, the highest of the three grades, three are at Grade II*, the middle grade, and the others are at Grade II, the lowest grade.  The parish contains the town of Ilkley, the adjacent village of Ben Rhydding, and the surrounding countryside.  By the early 19th century Ilkley was a small village at an intersection of roads, and it then grew as a spa town, before later becoming a dormitory town for Bradford and Leeds.  Most of the listed buildings are houses, cottages and associated strictures, farmhouses and farm buildings.  The other listed buildings include churches, chapels and associated structures, schools, milestones and mileposts, a bath house, hotels, a railway station, a post box, a town hall, library and theatre, memorial gardens containing two war memorials, a lido, and a mural.


Key

Buildings

References

Citations

Sources

 

Lists of listed buildings in West Yorkshire
Listed